Re-encounter (lit. "Hye-hwa, Child") is a 2011 South Korean indie film written and directed by Min Yong-keun. Starring Yoo Da-in and Yoo Yeon-seok, it is a coming of age story about two young people who fall in love but lose contact when the girl becomes pregnant and the boy leaves her to go to Canada; they meet again after five years to look for their child, who they believe has been adopted.

It premiered at the 15th Busan International Film Festival in 2010, and was released in theaters on February 17, 2011.

Plot
When precocious teenager Hye-hwa realizes that she is pregnant, the assertive young woman seems to have everything under control. But her convictions come crashing down when her loving, docile boyfriend Han-soo disappears without a word, apparently having been exiled to Canada by his mother.

Five years down the road, Hye-hwa’s spunky attitude and fondness for colorful manicures have been replaced by a fixation with rescuing abandoned dogs when she's not grooming the creatures for a living. Mothering her widowed boss's son provides her some relief; she is wise and weathered far beyond her 23 years. The fragile equilibrium maintained by her routine lifestyle breaks, however, after an unwarranted re-encounter with Han-soo.

At first Hye-hwa refuses her ex's approach, but her heart drops when he informs her that their child is actually well and alive — contrary to her understanding that the baby girl had died hours after birth. Han-soo explains that their daughter had been given up for adoption by their own grandmothers. Unable to help herself, Hye-hwa goes along with him in trying to track the baby down, leading to tragic consequences.

Cast
Yoo Da-in as Hye-hwa
Yoo Yeon-seok as Han-soo 
Park Hyuk-kwon as veterinarian Jung-hun
Choi Hee-won as Na-yeon 
Son Young-soon as Hye-hwa's mother 
Park Sung-yeon as Han-soo's sister 
Gil Hae-yeon as Han-soo's mother 
Kim Joo-ryoung as Hwa-young 
Kim Tae-in as Kindergarten director 
Kwon Oh-jin

Reception
An indie film with unknown actors and a production budget of just , Re-encounter drew favorable reviews from critics. It attracted a little more than 10,000 viewers, which is a dream figure in the world of Korean indie films, where low production budgets, minimal promotion and short runs in theaters are the norm.

Re-encounter was sponsored in part by the Korean Film Council and the Seoul Film Commission, who covered half of the film's production costs. The film's production team later made headlines for donating all of the proceeds from ticket sales to film and arts organizations such as the Seoul Independent Film Festival and MediACT.

Awards
2010 15th Busan International Film Festival: Best Director, Korean Cinema Today: Vision section - Min Yong-keun
2010 36th Seoul Independent Film Festival: Independent Star Award - Yoo Da-in
2010 36th Seoul Independent Film Festival: Kodak Award
2010 36th Seoul Independent Film Festival: Best Film 
2011 31st Korean Association of Film Critics Awards: Best New Actress - Yoo Da-in
2012 13th Asian Film Festival (Tours, France): Best Performance by an Actress - Yoo Da-in
2012 13th Asian Film Festival (Tours, France): Jury Award

References

External links
 Re-encounter at Naver 
 
 
 

2010 films
South Korean drama films
South Korean independent films
2010 drama films
Teenage pregnancy in film
2010 independent films
2010s South Korean films
2010s Korean-language films